Iain Anthony Robertson (born 9 November 1982 in Christchurch) is a first class cricketer who plays for the Canterbury Wizards. He played for New Zealand in the 2002 U-19 Cricket World Cup in New Zealand. In 2007 he played for Countesthorpe Cricket Club in Leicestershire.  Up to April 2009, he'd played 21 first class games, scoring 828 runs at nearly 40 and taking 17 wickets with his off breaks.

See also
 List of Otago representative cricketers

References

1982 births
Living people
New Zealand cricketers
Canterbury cricketers
Otago cricketers